E 572 is a B-class European route connecting Trenčín in Slovakia to Žiar nad Hronom. The route is approximately 101 km long.

Route and E-road junctions
  (on shared signage  I9 (includes interspersed sections upgraded to  R2) then  I65)
 Trenčín:  , 
 Žiar nad Hronom:  ,

External links 
 UN Economic Commission for Europe: Overall Map of E-road Network (2007)
 International E-road network

International E-road network
Roads in Slovakia